In life sciences funga is a recent term for the kingdom fungi similar to the longstanding fauna for animals and flora for plants. The term was considered to be needed in order to simplify projects oriented toward implementation of educational and conservation goals. An informal meeting held during the IX Congreso Latinoamericano de Micología resulted in a proposal for the term in 2018; alternative terms were also proposed and discussed. Funga was recommended by the IUCN in 2021. The term  highlights parallel terminology referring to treatments of these macroorganisms of particular geographical areas.

The Species Survival Commission (SSC) of the International Union for Conservation of Nature (IUCN) in August 2021 called for the recognition of fungi as one of three kingdoms of life, and critical to protecting and restoring Earth. They ask that the phrase animals and plants be replaced by animals, fungi, and plants, and fauna and flora by fauna, flora, and funga.

The term funga had been used in the scientific literature before the later recommendation.

References

Life sciences
Fungi